The siege of Hulst (1645) was the last major siege of the Eighty Years' War. The heavily fortified town of Hulst was conquered by Dutch troops commanded by Frederick Henry after only 28 days. The Spanish were informed of the siege only two days before it started. The Spanish army compromised 2,500 infantrymen and 250 cavalry. The Dutch attacked with a force of 12,500 infantry, 2,500 cavalry and 20 pieces of artillery.

The battle

The battle was split in two stages.

First stage:

Frederick commanded 4,500 infantry and 5 pieces of artillery to attack the east side of the city. When the Dutch forces reached the Eastern side of the city, they met a small Spanish force of 1,500 men. The Dutch started with several cannon shots which killed already 100 men. The Spanish were quickly approached by the Dutch forces. In 10 days, the Spanish lost 1,000 men and the Dutch lost 400 men. The Dutch now controlled the east side of the city.

Second stage:

After Frederick heard about the success in the eastern Hulst he sent 1,000 cavalry reinforcements. He then attacked the center of the city. (The Spanish commander ordered the cavalry to rush toward Frederick himself. However, the cavalry was ambushed and nearly annihilated.) After 18 days of artillery fire, the Spanish commander finally surrendered.

Aftermath
The Dutch captured Hulst with minimum losses: 1,500 infantry and 100 cavalry.  The Spanish losses were: 2,000 infantry and 225 cavalry.

References

Hulst
Hulst
Hulst
Conflicts in 1645
1645 in the Habsburg Netherlands
1645 in the Dutch Republic
Battles in Zeeland
Hulst
Zeelandic Flanders
Hulst 1645